Jim Crow was a rap group from Atlanta made up of Polow da Don, Cutty Cartel, and Mr. Mo.

Their debut album peaked at No. 99 on Billboard'''s Top R&B/Hip-Hop Albums chart. Its first single, "That Drama (Baby's Mama)", featuring Too Short, peaked at No. 25 on the Hot Rap Songs chart.

Slick Rick and Sean Paul were among the guests who appeared on the group's second album, Right Quick.

Critical receptionVibe called the debut "exceptional," writing that the group "come off lovely in the lyrics department, rocking rushed conversational flows and tight rhymes that are often filled with satire." The Atlanta Constitution deemed it "a debut outstanding in its near sample-free production and well-rounded in its storytelling." The Republican concluded that "there's a synchronicity to the rapid rhymes of Mr. Mo, Cartel and Polow, a solid flow that adds depth to tracks like the tough-talkin' 'Bandits', and the dope 'n' drink groove-fest 'Low, Low'."Billboard thought that "the group's controversial name is a tip-off to its secret weapon—they're serious jokesters ... Not for the light-hearted, Crow's Nest is an amalgam of bluesy beats and tragic parables." The Cincinnati Post awarded the debut an A+, and determined that "Mr. Mo, Cartel and Polow display dizzying rhyme excursions draped over inventively thumping beats packed with soulful hooks ... The group comfortably alternates among raw hard-core, party anthems, comical tracks and thought-provoking fare."

 Discography 
 Albums 
 Crow's Nest (1999)
 Right Quick'' (2001)

Singles 
 "Bandits" (1999)
 "That Drama (Baby's Mama)" (featuring Jazze Pha and Too Short) (1999)
 "Holla at a Playa" (featuring Sean Paul of Youngbloodz and Jazze Pha) (2002)
 '"Hot Wheels" (2002)

References

American hip hop groups
Musical groups from Atlanta